Space Flight is an album recorded by organist Sam Lazar on June 1, 1960 for Argo Records. This was Lazar's debut recording, and the second recording by guitarist Grant Green.

Reception

Allmusic awarded the album 3 stars.

Track listing 
All compositions by Sam Lazar and E. Rodney Jones; except where noted.
 "Dig A Little Deeper" – 3:46
 "We Don't Know" – 2:51
 "Caramu" – 3:41
 "Ruby" (Mitchell Parish, Heinz Roemheld) – 3:56
 "Gigi Blues" – 4:01
 "Space Flight" – 2:39
 "Mad Lad" – 2:16
 "Funky Blues" – 2:31
 "Big Willie" [originally known as "Space Flight, Part 2"] – 3:22
 "My Babe" (Willie Dixon) – 4:12

Personnel
Sam Lazar – organ 
Grant Green – guitar 
Willie Dixon – bass
Chauncey Williams – drums
Technical
Ron Malo - engineer
U.S. Army - cover photography

References

1960 debut albums
Sam Lazar albums
Argo Records albums